The Newman National Football League, named after the mining centre of Newman, Western Australia, is an Australian rules football competition based in the Pilbara region of Western Australia.

History

The league was founded in 1972 with three clubs, Centrals, Saints and Tigers. in 1975 a fourth club Pioneers joined the competition. The four teams make the league unique in Australia as they believe they are the only league to have all four club rooms around the one oval. The Capricorn Oval is on Fortescue Avenue Newman. 

The league is affiliated with the West Australian Football Commission through the Western Australian Country Football League. Saints are the current premiers

Clubs

NNFL Fairest and Best & Leading Goal Kicker Awards

2009 ladder 

																			
																			
Finals

2010 ladder 
																		
																		
Finals

2011 ladder

																	

Finals

2013 ladder

2014 ladder

2015 ladder

2016 ladder

2018 ladder

2019 ladder

Further reading 
Spinifex Footy by Bill Knox
NNFL Website

References

External links
 

Australian rules football competitions in Western Australia
Sports leagues established in 1972
Sport in Pilbara
1972 establishments in Australia